A Global Boundary Stratotype Section and Point (GSSP) is an internationally agreed upon reference point on a stratigraphic section which defines the lower boundary of a stage on the geologic time scale.  The effort to define GSSPs is conducted by the International Commission on Stratigraphy, a part of the International Union of Geological Sciences.  Most, but not all, GSSPs are based on paleontological changes.  Hence GSSPs are usually described in terms of transitions between different faunal stages, though far more faunal stages have been described than GSSPs.  The GSSP definition effort commenced in 1977.  As of 2022, 78 of the 101 stages that need a GSSP have a ratified GSSP.

Rules
A geologic section has to fulfill a set of criteria to be adapted as a GSSP by the ICS. The following list summarizes the criteria:

 A GSSP has to define the lower boundary of a geologic stage.
 The lower boundary has to be defined using a primary marker (usually first appearance datum of a fossil species).
 There should also be secondary markers (other fossils, chemical, geomagnetic reversal).
 The horizon in which the marker appears should have minerals that can be radiometrically dated.
 The marker has to have regional and global correlation in outcrops of the same age
 The marker should be independent of facies.
 The outcrop has to have an adequate thickness
 Sedimentation has to be continuous without any changes in facies
 The outcrop should be unaffected by tectonic and sedimentary movements, and metamorphism
 The outcrop has to be accessible to research and free to access.
 This includes that the outcrop has to be located where it can be visited quickly (International airport and good roads), has to be kept in good condition (Ideally a national reserve), in accessible terrain, extensive enough to allow repeated sampling and open to researchers of all nationalities.

Agreed-upon Global Boundary Stratotype Section and Points

Once a GSSP boundary has been agreed upon, a "golden spike" is driven into the geologic section to mark the precise boundary for future geologists (though in practice the "spike" need neither be golden nor an actual spike).  The first stratigraphic boundary was defined in 1972 by identifying the Silurian-Devonian boundary with a bronze plaque at a locality called Klonk, northeast of the village of Suchomasty in the Czech Republic. GSSPs are also sometimes referred to as Golden Spikes.

Fortune Head GSSP
The Precambrian-Cambrian boundary GSSP at Fortune Head, Newfoundland is a typical GSSP.  It is accessible by paved road and is set aside as a nature preserve.  A continuous section is available from beds that are clearly Precambrian into beds that are clearly Cambrian.  The boundary is set at the first appearance of a complex trace fossil Treptichnus pedum that is found worldwide.  The Fortune Head GSSP is unlikely to be washed away or built over. Nonetheless, Treptichnus pedum is less than ideal as a marker fossil as it is not found in every Cambrian sequence, and it is not assured that it is found at the same level in every exposure. In fact, further eroding its value as a boundary marker, it has since been identified in strata 4m below the GSSP.
However, no other fossil is known that would be preferable.  There is no radiometrically datable bed at the boundary at Fortune Head, but there is one slightly above the boundary in similar beds nearby.
These factors have led some geologists to suggest that this GSSP is in need of reassigning.

Global Standard Stratigraphic Ages

Because defining a GSSP depends on finding well-preserved geologic sections and identifying key events, this task becomes more difficult as one goes farther back in time.  Before 630 million years ago, boundaries on the geologic timescale are defined simply by reference to fixed dates, known as "Global Standard Stratigraphic Ages".

See also

Body plan
MN zonation
Fauna
Geologic time scale
New Zealand geologic time scale
List of Global Boundary Stratotype Sections and Points
North American land mammal age
Type locality

Notes

References
 Hedberg, H.D., (editor), International stratigraphic guide: A guide to stratigraphic classification, terminology, and procedure, New York, John Wiley and Sons, 1976
 International Stratigraphic Chart from the International Commission on Stratigraphy
  GSSP table with pages on each ratified GSSP from the ICS Subcommission for Stratigraphic Information
 USA National Park Service
 Washington State University 
 Web Geological Time Machine
 Eon or Aeon, Math Words – An alphabetical index

External links
 The Global Boundary Stratotype Section and Point (GSSP): overview
 Chart of The Global Boundary Stratotype Sections and Points (GSSP): chart
 Table of Global Boundary Stratotype Sections and Points (GSSPs) with links to summary pages for each one: chart
 GSSPs and Continental drift 3D views
 Geotime chart displaying geologic time periods compared to the fossil record – Deals with chronology and classifications for laymen (not GSSPs)

Earth sciences
Geochronologically significant locations
Geologic time scales of Earth
Historical geology
Paleogeography
Paleobiology
Units of time
Stratigraphy